William Whewell (1794–1866) was an English polymath and Master of Trinity College, Cambridge.

Whewell may also refer to:

People with the surname
John Whewell (1887–1948), English cricketer
Tim Whewell, British journalist

Other
Mount Whewell, a 2,945 m peak in the Admiralty Mountains, Victoria Land, Australia
Whewell (crater),  a crater on the Moon to the west of the Mare Tranquillitatis
Whewell equation, an equation relating to the tangential angle of a curve